A night porter is a porter who is on duty during the night.  A hotel commonly has a night porter to attend to the needs of guests and other incidents during the night.

Traditionally a night porter might also be required to perform sundry maintenance and cleaning tasks such as polishing boots, emptying spittoons and laying fires.

See also
Caretaker
Concierge
Receptionist

References

External links
Security Guard Company

Night
Protective service occupations